This article is about the demographic features of the population of São Tomé and Príncipe, including population density, ethnicity, education level, health of the populace, economic status, religious affiliations and other aspects of the population.

Of São Tomé and Príncipe's total population of some 201,800, about 193,380 live on São Tomé and 8,420 on Príncipe. All are descended from various ethnic groups that have migrated to the islands since 1485. 70% of the people on São Tomé and Príncipe are black and 30% of the people are mixed race, mostly black and white. Six groups are identifiable:

 Luso-Africans, or mixed-heritage, descendants of Portuguese colonists and African slaves brought to the islands during the early years of settlement from Benin, Gabon, the Republic of the Congo, the Democratic Republic of the Congo, and Angola (these people also are known as filhos da terra or "children of the land");
 Angolares, reputedly descendants of Angolan slaves who survived a 1540 shipwreck and now earn their livelihood fishing;
 Forros, descendants of freed slaves when slavery was abolished;
 Serviçais, contract laborers from Angola, Mozambique, and Cape Verde, living temporarily on the islands;
 Tongas, children of servicais born on the islands; and
 Europeans, primarily Portuguese.
Asians, mostly Chinese minority, including Macanese people of mixed Portuguese and Chinese blood from Macau.
 
Although a small country, São Tomé and Príncipe has four national languages: Portuguese (the official language, spoken by 95% of the population), and the Portuguese-based creoles Forro (85%), Angolar (3%) and Principense (0.1%). French is also learned in schools, as the country is a member of Francophonie.

In the 1970s, there were two significant population movements—the exodus of most of the 4,000 Portuguese residents and the influx of several hundred São Toméan refugees from Angola. The islanders have been absorbed largely into a common Luso-African culture. Almost all belong to the Roman Catholic, Evangelical Protestant, or Seventh-day Adventist churches, which in turn retain close ties with churches in Portugal. There is a small but growing Muslim population.

Population

According to the 2022 revision of the world factbook the total population was 217,164 in 2022, compared to only 60,000 in 1950. The proportion of children below the age of 15 in 2020 was 39.8%, 57.4% was between 15 and 65 years of age, while 2.9% was 65 years or older.

Population Estimates by Sex and Age Group (01.VII.2017):

Vital statistics
Registration of vital events is in São Tomé & Príncipe not available for recent years. The Population Departement of the United Nations prepared the following estimates.

Births and deaths

Fertility Rate (The Demographic Health Survey)

Fertility Rate (TFR) (Wanted Fertility Rate) and CBR (Crude Birth Rate):

Fertility data as of 2008-2009 (DHS Program):

Life expectancy

Other demographic statistics 
Demographic statistics according to the World Population Review in 2022.

One birth every 76 minutes	
One death every 480 minutes	
One net migrant every 360 minutes	
Net gain of one person every 120 minutes

The following demographic are from the CIA World Factbook unless otherwise indicated.

Population
217,164 (2022 est.)
204,454 (July 2018 est.)

Religions
Catholic 55.7%, Adventist 4.1%, Assembly of God 3.4%, New Apostolic 2.9%, Mana 2.3%, Universal Kingdom of God 2%, Jehovah's Witness 1.2%, other 6.2%, none 21.2%, unspecified 1% (2012 est.)

Age structure

0-14 years: 39.77% (male 42,690/female 41,277)
15-24 years: 21.59% (male 23,088/female 22,487)
25-54 years: 31.61% (male 32,900/female 33,834)
55-64 years: 4.17% (male 4,095/female 4,700)
65 years and over: 2.87% (2020 est.) (male 2,631/female 3,420)

0-14 years: 41.2% (male 42,825 /female 41,403)
15-24 years: 21.01% (male 21,767 /female 21,188)
25-54 years: 31.03% (male 31,218 /female 32,229)
55-64 years: 3.93% (male 3,708 /female 4,332)
65 years and over: 2.83% (male 2,545 /female 3,239) (2018 est.)

Birth rate
28.19 births/1,000 population (2022 est.) Country comparison to the world: 36th
31.5 births/1,000 population (2018 est.) Country comparison to the world: 32nd

Death rate
6.2 deaths/1,000 population (2022 est.) Country comparison to the world: 149th
6.7 deaths/1,000 population (2018 est.) Country comparison to the world: 138th

Total fertility rate
3.56 children born/woman (2022 est.) Country comparison to the world: 36th
4.11 children born/woman (2018 est.) Country comparison to the world: 31st

Population growth rate
1.48% (2022 est.) Country comparison to the world: 65th
1.66% (2018 est.) Country comparison to the world: 62nd

Median age
total: 19.3 years. Country comparison to the world: 204th
male: 18.9 years
female: 19.7 years (2020 est.)

total: 18.7 years. Country comparison to the world: 207th
male: 18.3 years 
female: 19.1 years (2018 est.)

Mother's mean age at first birth
19.4 years (2008/09 est.)
note: median age at first birth among women 25-29

Contraceptive prevalence rate
49.7% (2019)
40.6% (2014)

Net migration rate
-7.19 migrant(s)/1,000 population (2022 est.) Country comparison to the world: 214th
-8.3 migrant(s)/1,000 population (2017 est.) Country comparison to the world: 207th

Dependency ratios
total dependency ratio: 86.7 (2015 est.)
youth dependency ratio: 81.1 (2015 est.)
elderly dependency ratio: 5.6 (2015 est.)
potential support ratio: 17.8 (2015 est.)

Urbanization
urban population: 75.8% of total population (2022)
rate of urbanization: 2.96% annual rate of change (2020-25 est.)

urban population: 72.8% of total population (2018)
rate of urbanization: 3.33% annual rate of change (2015-20 est.)

Life expectancy at birth
total population: 67.06 years. Country comparison to the world: 194th
male: 65.44 years
female: 68.72 years (2022 est.)

total population: 65.7 years 
male: 64.3 years
female: 67.1 years (2018 est.)

total population: 65.25 years
male: 63.84 years
female: 66.7 years (2000 est.)

Major infectious diseases
degree of risk: high (2020)
food or waterborne diseases: bacterial diarrhea, hepatitis A, and typhoid fever
vectorborne diseases: malaria and dengue fever
water contact diseases: schistosomiasis

Sex ratio
at birth:
male(s)/female
under 15 years:
1.03 male(s)/female
15–64 years:
0.93 male(s)/female
65 years and over:
0.84 male(s)/female
total population:
0.97 male(s)/female (2000 est.)

Nationality
noun:
São Toméan(s)
adjective:
São Toméan

Ethnic groups
Mestiços, angolares (descendants of Angolan slaves), forros (descendants of freed slaves), serviçais (contract laborers from Angola, Mozambique, and Cape Verde), tongas (children of serviçais born on the islands) and Europeans (primarily Portuguese).

Languages

Portuguese 98.4% (official), Forro 36.2%, Cabo Verdian 8.5%, French 6.8%, Angolar 6.6%, English 4.9%, Lunguie 1%, Other (including sign language) 2.4%

Education expenditures
5.9% of GDP (2019) Country comparison to the world: 35th

Literacy
definition: age 15 and over can read and write
total population: 92.8%
male: 96.2%
female: 89.5% (2018)

total population: 74.9% (2015 est.)
male: 81.8% (2015 est.)
female: 68.4% (2015 est.)

total population: 73%
male: 85%
female: 62% (1991 est.)

School life expectancy (primary to tertiary education)
total: 12 years (2015)
male: 12 years (2015)
female: 13 years (2015)

Unemployment, youth ages 15-24
total: 20.8% (2012 est.)

References

 
Sao Tome
Society of São Tomé and Príncipe